Francisco Fabiano Pereira Marciano (born April 28, 1983), known as Fabiano Pereira or Fabiano, is a Brazilian footballer who plays as defender for ASA.

Career statistics

References

External links

1983 births
Living people
Brazilian footballers
Association football defenders
ABC Futebol Clube players
Sousa Esporte Clube players
América Futebol Clube (RN) players
Alecrim Futebol Clube players
Agremiação Sportiva Arapiraquense players
Maringá Futebol Clube players
Foz do Iguaçu Futebol Clube players
Nacional Futebol Clube players
Campeonato Brasileiro Série B players
Campeonato Brasileiro Série C players
Campeonato Brasileiro Série D players
Campeonato Paranaense players
Sportspeople from Rio Grande do Norte